A violin sonata is a musical composition for violin, which is nearly always accompanied by a piano or other keyboard instrument, or by figured bass in the Baroque period.

List

A
Tomaso Albinoni
Sonate da chiesa ("Op. 4") (for violin and basso continuo) (Amsterdam, c.1708)
[5] Sonate, violin and basso continuo, … e uno suario o capriccio … del Sig. Tibaldi (Amsterdam, c1717)
6 sonates da camera, for violin and harpsichord, Op. Posth. (Paris, c.1740)
Charles-Valentin Alkan
Grand Duo Concertant (sonata) in F-sharp minor, Op. 21 (c. 1840)
Kurt Atterberg
Sonata (for violin, cello, viola or horn, with piano) in B minor, Op. 27 (1925)

B
Carl Philipp Emanuel Bach
12 for violin with continuo and cello, five for violin and keyboard
Sonatas for violin and harpsichord BWV 1020, 1022
Johann Christian Bach
nine (Opp. 10 and 20), also several flute sonatas that can be played with violin
Johann Sebastian Bach
Solo sonatas BWV 1001, 1003 and 1005, included in Sonatas and Partitas for Solo Violin (1720)
Six Sonatas for Violin and Harpsichord, BWV 1014–1019
Sonatas for violin and continuo BWV 1021, 1023, and the doubtful 1024
Béla Bartók
Early sonata for violin and piano
Sonata No. 1 for violin and piano, 1921
Sonata No. 2 for violin and piano, 1922
Sonata for solo violin, 1944
Arnold Bax
Violin Sonata in G minor (1901) (recently recorded on ASV but a rarity)
Sonata No. 1 in E major, first version 1920/1, revised 1945
Sonata No. 2 in D major, 1915/1921
Sonata No. 3 in G minor, 1927
 Sonata in F major (alternate version of his Nonet) 1940
Amy Beach
Violin Sonata in A minor (1896)
Ludwig van Beethoven
Violin Sonata in A major (fragmentary) (1790-92)
Violin Sonata No. 1 (1798)
Violin Sonata No. 2 (1798)
Violin Sonata No. 3 (1798)
Violin Sonata No. 4 (1800)
Violin Sonata No. 5 (1800-01)
Violin Sonata No. 6 (1801-02)
Violin Sonata No. 7 (1801-02)
Violin Sonata No. 8 (1801-02)
Violin Sonata No. 9 (1802-03)
Violin Sonata No. 10 (1812)
Richard Rodney Bennett
Sonata for violin and piano (1978)
Violin Sonata No.1 Op.50 (1999)
Violin Sonata No.2 Op.56 (2000)
Heinrich Ignaz Biber
Mystery Sonatas for violin and figured bass
 Sonatae violino solo (8 sonatas for violin and continuo) (1681)
Sonata, for violin & continuo No. 1 in A major
Sonata, for violin & continuo No. 2 in D minor
Sonata, for violin & continuo No. 3 in F major
Sonata, for violin & continuo No. 4 in D major
Sonata, for violin & continuo No. 5 in E minor
Sonata, for violin & continuo No. 6 in C minor
Sonata, for violin & continuo No. 7 in G minor
Sonata, for violin & continuo No. 8 in G major
Sonata violino solo representativa (Representatio Avium), for violin & continuo in A major, 1669?
Sonata, for solo violin in A major
Ernest Bloch
Violin Sonata No. 1, 1920
Violin Sonata No. 2 Poeme Mystique, 1924
Theodor Blumer
Violin Sonata
Nimrod Borenstein
Sonata for violin and piano Op. 1 (1994)
Sonata concertante Op. 61 for violin and piano (2013)
Johannes Brahms
Sonatensatz (sonata scherzo in C minor, for the 'F-A-E' Sonata collaborative sonata undertaken by Dietrich, Schumann and Brahms – 1853)
(early A minor sonata, lost, reported by Remenyi)
Violin Sonata No. 1 in G major, Rain Sonata, Op. 78, 1878–79
Violin Sonata No. 2 in A major, Thun, Op. 100, 1886
Violin Sonata No. 3 in D minor, Op. 108, 1886–88
James Francis Brown
Sonata for Violin and Piano (2001. Rev 2003)
Frank Bridge
Violin Sonata (1932)
Ferruccio Busoni
violin sonata (early) in C major, 1876
violin sonata Op. 29 in E minor, 1890
violin sonata Op. 36a in E minor, 1898

C
Samuel Coleridge-Taylor
Violin Sonata in D minor, Op. 28
Aaron Copland
Violin Sonata (1943)
Arcangelo Corelli
violin sonatas with continuo (Op. 5, Nos. 1–12)
John Corigliano
Violin Sonata (1963, some sources have 1964)

D
Claude Debussy
Violin Sonata in G minor, 1917
Frederick Delius
Violin Sonata published posth., 1892
Violin Sonata No. 1, 1914
Violin Sonata No. 2, 1923
Violin Sonata No. 3, 1930
Edison Denisov
Sonata for violin solo, 1978
Violin Sonata, 1963
Ernő Dohnányi
Violin Sonata in C-sharp minor, Op. 21, 1913?
Avner Dorman
 Sonata No.1 for Violin and Piano, 2004
 Sonata No.2 for Violin and Piano, 2008
 Sonata No.3 for Violin and Piano, 2011
Lucien Durosoir
Violin Sonata in A major, 1921
Antonín Dvořák
Violin Sonata in F major, Op. 57, 1880
Violin Sonatina in G major, Op. 100, 1893

E
Edward Elgar
Violin Sonata in E minor, Op. 82
George Enescu
Violin Sonata fragment Torso
Violin Sonata No. 1 in D major, Op. 2
Violin Sonata No. 2 in F minor, Op. 6
Violin Sonata No. 3 dans le caractère populaire roumain (in Romanian Folk Style) in A minor, Op. 25
Sven Einar Englund
Violin Sonata (1979)
Iván Erőd
1st Sonata op. 14 (1970)
2nd Sonata op. 74 (2000)

F
Gabriel Fauré
Violin Sonata No. 1 in A major, Op. 13
Violin Sonata No. 2 in E minor, Op. 108
Mohammed Fairouz
Sonata for Solo Violin (2011)
Leonid Feigin
Violin Sonata No. 1 (1963)
Violin Sonata No. 2 (1981)
Zdeněk Fibich
Violin Sonata in D major
Violin Sonatina in D minor, Op. 27
Grzegorz Fitelberg
at least two violin sonatas (A minor, Op. 2, F major, Op. 12: by 1905)
Irving Fine
Violin Sonata
Nicolas Flagello
Violin Sonata
Josef Bohuslav Foerster
Sonata No. 1, Op. 10
Sonata No. 2, sonata quasi fantasia, Op. 177
César Franck
Violin Sonata in A major, M. 8
Peter Racine Fricker
Violin Sonata No. 1, Op. 12 (1950) 
Violin Sonata No. 2, Op. 94 (1987)

Robert Fuchs
six violin sonatas
Wilhelm Furtwängler
Violin Sonata No. 1 in D minor (1935)
Violin Sonata No. 2 in D major (1939)

G
Niels Wilhelm Gade
three sonatas: Op. 6 in A, Op. 21 in D minor, Op. 59 in B-flat major
Hans Gál
Violin Sonata, Op. 17 (also at least one other)
Violin Sonata in D (1933)
Three Sonatinas, Op. 71  (1956)
Friedrich Gernsheim
four violin sonatas
Joseph Gibbs
Eight solos (sonatas) for the violin and a thorough bass, 1748
Philip Glass
Sonata for Violin and Piano
Benjamin Godard
Four violin sonatas (No. 1, Op. 1; No. 2, Op. 2; No. 3 in D minor, Op. 9; No. 4 in A-flat major, Op. 12)
Karl Goldmark
Violin Sonata in D major/B minor, Op. 25
Edvard Grieg
Violin Sonatas   and 
Jorge Grundman
What Inspires Poetry. Violin and Piano Sonata (2008)
Warhol in Springtime. Violin and Piano Sonata (2011)
White Sonata: The Child Who Never Wanted to Grow Up. Violin and Piano Sonata (2012)
Camargo Guarnieri
Violin Sonata No. 1 (1930)
Violin Sonata No. 2 (1933)
Violin Sonata No. 3 (1950)
Violin Sonata No. 4 (1956)
Violin Sonata No. 5 (1959)
Violin Sonata No. 6 (1965)
Violin Sonata No. 7
Violin sonata

H
Reynaldo Hahn
Sonata in C major (1926)
George Frideric Handel
Sonata for violin and basso continuo in D minor (HWV 359a)
Sonata for violin and basso continuo in A major (HWV 361)
Sonata for violin and basso continuo in G minor (HWV 364a)
Sonata for violin and basso continuo in G minor (HWV 368) (probably spurious)
Sonata for violin and basso continuo in F major (HWV 370) (probably spurious)
Sonata for violin and basso continuo in D major (HWV 371)
Sonata for violin and basso continuo in A major (HWV 372) (probably spurious)
Sobata for violin and basso continuo in E major (HWV 373) (probably spurious)
Karl Amadeus Hartmann
sonatas for violin solo
Franz Joseph Haydn
Sonata for keyboard and obbligato violin in B-flat major Hob:XVa:1
Sonata for keyboard and obbligato violin in D major Hob:XVa:2
Sonata for keyboard and obbligato violin in C major Hob:XVa:3
Swan Hennessy
Sonate en Fa (Style Irlandais), Op. 14 (1905)
Deuxième Sonatine, Op. 80 (1929)
Hans Werner Henze
Sonata for violin and piano (1946)
Sonata for violin solo (1977; revised 1992)
Sonatina for violin and piano (1979) [from the opera Pollicino]
Paul Hindemith
sonatas for violin solo, and four with piano
C. René Hirschfeld
sonata concertante for violin and piano (2006)
Vagn Holmboe
Violin Sonata No. 1, M. 82, 1935
Violin Sonata No. 2, M. 112, 1939
Violin Sonata No. 3, M. 227, 1965
Arthur Honegger
Sonatas Nos. 0–2
Herbert Howells
three violin sonatas
Bertold Hummel
Violin Sonata, Op. 6 (1952) 
Violin Sonatina, Op. 35a (1969) 
Violin Sonatina, Op. 107a (2001)

I
Vincent d'Indy
Violin Sonata in C major, Op. 59
John Ireland
Violin Sonata No. 1 in D minor (1909)
Violin Sonata No. 2 in A minor (1917)
Charles Ives
four violin sonatas

J
Leoš Janáček
 Violin Sonata
André Jolivet
Violin Sonata (1932)
Paul Juon
Violin Sonata No. 1 in A major, op. 7
Violin Sonata No. 2 in F major, op. 69
Violin Sonata No. 3 in B minor, op. 86

K
Karen Khachaturian
Sonata for violin and piano
Erich Wolfgang Korngold
Violin Sonata in G major, Op. 6 (1912)
Ernst Krenek
Violin Sonata in F-sharp major, Op. 3 (1919)
6 sonatinas for violin and piano (without Op. number 61. 1921)
Violin Sonata No. 2, Op. 99 (1945) 
two sonatas for solo violin (Op. 33, 1925 and Op. 115, 1947)
Toivo Kuula
Violin Sonata in E minor, Op. 1 (1907)

L
Edouard Lalo
Violin Sonata in D major, Op.12
Jean-Marie Leclair
violin sonatas (at least Opp. 1, 2, 5, and 9 are sets of sonatas, some alternately for flute)
Benjamin Lees
3 Violin Sonatas
Paul Le Flem
Violin Sonata in G minor (1905)
Kenneth Leighton
Violin Sonata No. 1, Op. 4 (1949)
Violin Sonata No. 2, Op. 20 (1953)
Guillaume Lekeu
Violin Sonata in G major (1892/93)
Lowell Liebermann
Sonata for Violin and Piano, Op.46 (1994)
Douglas Lilburn
Violin Sonata No. 1 in E flat (1943)
Violin Sonata No. 2 in C (1943)
Violin Sonata No. 3 (1950)
Heitor Villa-Lobos
 Violin Sonata No. 1 Sonata-Fantasy No. 1, Désespérance (1913)
 Violin Sonata No. 2 Sonata-Fantasy (1914)
 Violin Sonata No. 3 (1920)
 Violin Sonata No. 4 (1923, lost)
Pietro Locatelli
Sonatas for violin with continuo from Opp. 6 and 8

M

Leevi Madetoja
Sonatina for violin and piano, Op. 18 (1913)
Albéric Magnard
Violin Sonata in G major, Op. 13
Edgar Manas
Sonata for Violin and Piano (1923)
Bohuslav Martinů
Violin Sonatas 1, 2, 3
Giuseppe Martucci
Violin Sonata in G minor, Op. 22
William Mathias
three violin sonatas
John Blackwood McEwen
at least six violin sonatas (No. 6 published 1930 by Oxford University Press)
Nikolai Medtner
Violin Sonata No. 1 in B minor, Op. 21 (1909-10)
Violin Sonata No. 2 in G major, Op. 44 (1922-25)
Violin Sonata No. 3 Epica in E minor, Op. 57 (1938)
Felix Mendelssohn
Violin Sonata in F major, 1820
Violin Sonata in F minor, Op. 4, 1823
Violin Sonata in F major, 1838
Peter Mennin
Sonata Concertante
Peter Mieg
Sonata for violin and piano (1936)
Darius Milhaud
at least two violin sonatas with piano, and one with harpsichord
Ernest John Moeran
Sonata for Violin and Piano in E minor
Wolfgang Amadeus Mozart
Violin Sonatas, KV 6–9 (for Keyboard and Violin) (1762-64)
No. 1 in C major (1762-64)
No. 2 in D major (1763-64)
No. 3 in B-flat major (1763-64)
No. 4 in G major (1764)
Violin Sonatas, KV 10–15 (for Keyboard with Violin or Flute, and Cello) (1764)
No. 5 in B-flat major (1764)
No. 6 in G major (1764)
No. 7 in A major (1764)
No. 8 in F major (1764) 
No. 9 in C major (1764) 
No. 10 in B-flat major (1764)
Violin Sonatas, KV 26–31 (for Keyboard and Violin) (1766)
No. 11 in E-flat major (1766) 
No. 12 in G major (1766)
No. 13 in C major (1766)
No. 14 in D major (1766) 
No. 15 in F major (1766)
No. 16 in B-flat major (1766)
 Violin Sonata No. 17 in C major, K. 296 (1778)
 Violin Sonata No. 18 in G major, K. 301 (1778)
 Violin Sonata No. 19 in E-flat major, K. 302 (1778)
 Violin Sonata No. 20 in C major, K. 303 (1778)
 Violin Sonata No. 21 in E minor, K. 304 (1778)
 Violin Sonata No. 22 in A major, K. 305 (1778)
 Violin Sonata No. 23 in D major, K. 306 (1778)
 Violin Sonata No. 24 in F major, K. 376 (1781)
 Violin Sonata No. 25 in F major, K. 377 (1781)
 Violin Sonata No. 26 in B-flat major, K. 378 (1779)
 Violin Sonata No. 27 in G major, K. 379 (1781)
 Violin Sonata No. 28 in E-flat major, K. 380 (1781)
 Violin Sonata No. 29 in A major, K. 402 (1782; fragment, completed by M. Stadler)
 Violin Sonata No. 30 in C major, K. 403 (1782; fragment, completed by M. Stadler)
 Violin Sonata No. 31 in C major, K. 404 (1782; fragment, completed by M. Stadler)
 Violin Sonata No. 32 in B-flat major, K. 454 (1784)
 Violin Sonata No. 33 in E-flat major, K. 481 (1785)
 Violin Sonata No. 34 in B-flat major, K. 372 (1781; fragment, completed by M. Stadler)
 Violin Sonata No. 35 in A major, K. 526 (1787)
 Violin Sonata No. 36 in F major, K. 547 (1788)
Nikolai Myaskovsky
Violin Sonata in F major, Op. 70 (1946–47)

N
Eduard Nápravník
Violin Sonata in G major, Op. 52
Lior Navok
Violin Sonata
Oskar Nedbal
Violin Sonata in B minor, Op. 9
Carl Nielsen
early sonatas
Violin Sonata in A major, Op. 9
Violin Sonata in G minor/C major, Op. 35
Vítězslav Novák
Violin Sonata in D minor (his 27th work, unpublished )

O
Leo Ornstein
Violin Sonata, Op. 26 (1914–15)
Violin Sonata, Op. 31 (1915)
Violin Sonata, Op. Posth (Unfinished)

P
Ignacy Jan Paderewski
Violin Sonata in A minor, Op. 13
Niccolò Paganini
Numerous sonatas for violin with piano or guitar
Hubert Parry
Fantasy-Sonata in B minor for violin and pianoforte (c. 1878)
Violin Sonata in D major (1889)
Robert Paterson
Sonata No. 1 for Violin and Piano (2003)
Dora Pejačević
Sonata for Violin and Piano in D major 'Frühlings-Sonate' Op. 26 (1909)
Sonata for Violin and Piano in B minor 'Slawische Sonate' Op. 43 (1917)
Krzysztof Penderecki
Violin Sonata No. 1 (1953)
Violin Sonata No. 2 (2000)
Wilhelm Peterson-Berger
Violin Sonata in E minor (1887)
Violin Sonata in G major (1910)
Violin Sonata in A minor (so far recorded only in cello transcription )
Gabriel Pierné
Sonata for violin (or flute), Op. 36
Johann Georg Pisendel
Sonata for violin and continuo in E minor
Sonata for violin and continuo in D major
Sonata for violin solo, in A minor
Walter Piston
Violin Sonata (1939)
Sonatina for violin and harpsichord (1945)
Quincy Porter
two violin sonatas (and a No. 0 posthumously published)
Francis Poulenc
Violin Sonata (1943)
Gerhard Präsent
Sonata del Gesù op. 35 (1997–99)
Sergei Prokofiev
Sonata for two violins in C major, Op. 56
Violin Sonata No. 1 in F minor, Op. 80 (1946)
Violin Sonata No. 2 in D major, Op. 94 (transcribed from flute sonata)
Sonata for solo violin in D major, Op. 115 (can also be played by massed unison ensemble.)

R
Joachim Raff
Violin Sonata in E minor, Op. 73
Violin Sonata in A major, Op. 78
Violin Sonata in D major, Op. 128
Violin Sonata in G minor Chromatische, Op. 129 (One movement)
Violin Sonata in C minor, Op. 145
Maurice Ravel
early violin sonata
Violin Sonata in G major
Alan Rawsthorne
Violin Sonata (1958)

Max Reger
9 violin sonatas with piano, several unaccompanied (four in op 42, seven in op 91)
Violin Sonata No. 1 in D minor, Op. 1
Violin Sonata No. 2 in D major, Op. 3
Violin Sonata No. 3 in A major, Op. 41
Violin Sonata No. 4 in C major, Op. 72 (gave rise to a scandal at its premiere with a work by Ludwig Thuille)
Violin Sonata No. 5 in F-sharp minor, Op. 84
Violin Sonata No. 6 in D minor, Op. 103b/1
Violin Sonata No. 7 in A major, Op. 103b/2
Violin Sonata No. 8 in E minor, Op. 122
Violin Sonata No. 9 in C minor, Op. 139
(violin version of the clarinet sonata in B-flat major, Op. 107 sometimes included, and the sonatas Op. 103b are sometimes not.)
Carl Reinecke
Violin Sonata in E minor, Op. 116
Ottorino Respighi
Violin Sonata in D minor (1897)
Violin Sonata in B minor (1917)
Josef Rheinberger
Violin Sonata in E-flat major, Op. 77 (1874)
Violin Sonata in E minor, Op. 105 (1877)
Ferdinand Ries
Violin Sonata in A-flat major, WoO. 5
Violin Sonata in E-flat major, WoO. 7 (Fragmentary)
Violin Sonatas, Op. 3, Nº. 1–2
Violin Sonatas, Op. 8, Nº. 1–2
Violin Sonata in B-flat major, Op. 10
Violin Sonatas, Op. 16, Nº. 1–3
Violin Sonata in E-flat major Op. 18
Violin Sonata in F minor, Op. 19
Violin Sonatas, Op. 30, Nº. 1–3
Violin Sonatas, Op. 38, Nº. 1–3
Violin Sonata in E-flat major, Op. 69
Violin Sonata in C-sharp minor, Op. 71
Violin Sonata in D minor, Op. 83
George Rochberg
Violin Sonata
Guy Ropartz
several violin sonatas : No. 1 in D minor (1907), No. 2 in E major (1917), No. 3 in A major (1927)
John Luke Rose
Violin sonata op.28 (1973)
Nikolai Roslavets
Violin Sonatas 1–6 (3 and 5 lost)
Albert Roussel
Violin Sonata No. 1 in D minor, Op. 11
Violin Sonata No. 2 in A major, Op. 28
Edmund Rubbra
Violin Sonata No. 1, Op. 11 (1925)
Violin Sonata No. 2, Op. 31 (1931)
Violin Sonata No. 3, Op. 133 (premiered 1968)
Anton Rubinstein
Violin Sonata in G major, Op. 13
Violin Sonata in A minor, Op. 19
Violin Sonata in B minor, Op. 98

S
Camille Saint-Saëns
Violin Sonata No. 1 in D minor, Op. 75 (1885)
Violin Sonata No. 2 in E flat major, Op. 102 (1896)
Rosario Scalero
Violin Sonata in D minor, Op. 12
Philipp Scharwenka
Violin Sonata in B minor, Op. 110 (by 1900)
Violin Sonata in E minor, Op. 114
Xaver Scharwenka
Violin Sonata in D minor, Op. 2
Johann Heinrich Schmelzer
Sonatae unarum fidium (1664)
Florent Schmitt
 Sonate libre en deux parties enchaînées (ad modum clementis aquæ) Op.68, vn, pf (1918–19)
Alfred Schnittke
Violin Sonatas Nos. 1, 2, 3
Johann Schobert
2 Sonatas for harpsichord with violin ad libitum, Op. 1
2 Sonatas for harpsichord, with violin obbligato, Op. 2
2 Sonatas for harpsichord with violin ad libitum, Op. 3
2 Sonatas for harpsichord with violin ad libitum, Op. 5
2 Sonatas for harpsichord with violin obbligato, Op. 8
6 Sonatas for harpsichord with violin ad libitum, Op. 14 (No. 1 with violin and viola ad libitum)
4 Sonatas for harpsichord and violin, Op. 17
2 Sonatas for harpsichord (or pianoforte) and violin, Op. 19 (posthumous)
3 Sonatas for harpsichord and violin, Op. 20 (spurious, probably by Tommaso Giordani)
Othmar Schoeck
Violin Sonata, Op. 16
Violin Sonata, Op. 46
Violin Sonata, WoO 22 (information from a recent Claves CD release informational listing )
Franz Schubert
Sonatas for piano and obbligato violin (Sonatinas), Op. 137 (1816): No. 1 in D major, No. 2 in A minor and No. 3 in G minor
Violin Sonata (Duo) in A major, D 574 (1817)
Ervin Schulhoff
Violin Sonata Op.7 (1913)
Sonata for Solo Violin (1927)
Violin Sonata No.2 (1927)
Robert Schumann
Violin Sonata No. 1 in A minor, Op. 105 (1851)
Violin Sonata No. 2 in D minor, Op. 121 (1851)
collaboration with Johannes Brahms and Albert Dietrich in the F-A-E Sonata for Joseph Joachim (1853)
Violin Sonata No. 3 in A minor – third and fourth movements from the F-A-E sonata (1853)
Laura Schwendinger
Sonata for Solo Violin (1991)
Roger Sessions
Sonata for Solo Violin
Michael Jeffrey Shapiro
Violin Sonata No. 1 (1974)
Violin Sonata No. 2 (2009)
Alexander Shchetynsky
Sonata for Violin and Piano (1990)
Sonata for Solo Violin (2009)
Dmitri Shostakovich
Violin Sonata, Op. 134 (1968)
Jean Sibelius
Violin Sonata in A minor, JS 177 (1884)
Violin Sonata in F major, JS 178 (1889)
Violin Sonatina in E major, Op. 80 (1915)
Robert Simpson
Sonata for Violin and Piano, in two movements (1984)
Fredrik Sixten
Sonata for violin and piano
Nikos Skalkottas
Sonata for solo violin (1925)
2nd Violin Sonata (1940)
Sonatinas nos. 1–4 (1928–35)
Ethel Smyth
Violin Sonata in A minor, Op. 7 (published 1887) (Not mentioned in the list of works linked to in the article but recorded on Troubadisc and noted in published articles- Dale's in Oct. 1949 Music & Letters.)
Louis Spohr
Sonata for Violin and Harp in B-flat major, Op. 16
Sonata for Violin and Harp in E-flat major, Op. 113
Sonata for Violin and Harp in E-flat major, Op. 114
Sonata for Violin and Harp in A-flat major, Op. 115
Sonata for Violin and Harp in C minor, WoO. 23
Charles Villiers Stanford
Violin Sonata No. 1 in D, Op. 11, 1877? (notes for another recording give 1880)
Violin Sonata No. 2 in A, Op. 70, 1898
Sonata for Violin with Piano Accompaniment, Op. 165, No. 1, 1919 (Lost)
Sonata for Violin with Piano Accompaniment, Op. 165, No. 2, 1919 (Lost)
Wilhelm Stenhammar
Violin Sonata in A minor, Op. 19 (1899/1900)
Richard Strauss
Violin Sonata in E-flat major, Op. 18 (1887)
Constantinos Stylianou
Sonata for Violin and Piano (2014-15)
Karol Szymanowski
Violin Sonata in D minor, Op. 9 (1904)

T
Germaine Tailleferre
two violin sonatas (first from 1921; the second, from 1951 a transcription of her violin concerto)
Sergei Taneyev
Violin Sonata in A minor
Giuseppe Tartini
Devil's Trill sonata and many others
Georg Philipp Telemann
Methodical Sonatas for violin and continuo
Sonates sans basse and Canonic Sonatas, both sets for two instruments (e.g. violins)
Susan Trew
Sonata for violin and piano (1893)
Eduard Tubin
Violin Sonata No. 1 (1936)
Violin Sonata No. 2 in Phrygian key (1949)
Solo violin sonata (1962)
Joaquín Turina
Sonate Espagnole (1908)
Sonata No.1, Op. 51
Sonata No.2, Op. 82

V
Ralph Vaughan Williams
Violin Sonata in A minor
Carlos Veerhoff
Violin sonata op.47 (1982)
Antonio Veracini
Sonate da camera [10], for solo violin, Op. 2 (Modena, c.1694)
Francesco Maria Veracini
12 Sonatas for recorder or violin solo and basso (no opus number, dedicated to Prince Friedrich August, before 1716, unpublished in the composer's lifetime)
12 Sonatas for violin solo and basso, Op. 1 (dedicated to Prince Friedrich August, 1721)
12 Sonate Accademiche for violin solo and basso, Op. 2 (1744)
Dissertazioni del Sigr. Francesco Veracini sopra l'opera quinta del Corelli [Dissertation by Mr. Francesco Veracini on Corelli's Opus 5]
Louis Vierne
Violin Sonata in G minor, Op. 23 (1905-6? Premiered 1908.)(Catalog of Vierne's music)
Heitor Villa-Lobos
Sonate-fantaisie No. 1 for violin and piano, Desesperança (Despair) (1913)
Sonate-fantaisie No. 2 for violin and piano (1914)
Sonata for violin and piano No. 3 (1920)
Sonata for violin and piano No. 4 (1923)
Giovanni Battista Viotti
Six published sonatas for violin and bass, Op. 4 (about 1788), six without Opus number. (Recorded on Dynamic S2002-4)
Antonio Vivaldi
Twelve sonatas (Op. 2), six sonatas (Op. 5) and other various, such as the Manchester Sonatas, rediscovered in the 1970s. Also the Op. 1 twelve sonatas, though these are for two violins and technically are trio sonatas.
Georg Joseph Vogler
Six Sonatas Op. 3

W
Henry Walford Davies
Violin Sonata No. 1 in E flat major (1893–95)
Violin Sonata No. 2 in A major (1893–95)
Violin Sonata No. 3 in E minor, Op. 5 (1894) 
Violin Sonata No. 4 in D minor, Op. 7 (1896) 
Violin Sonata No. 5 in F major (1899) 
William Walton
Violin Sonata (1949/rev 1950)
Carl Maria von Weber
6 sonatas for piano and obbligato violin, J 99–104, Op. 10b (1810): F major, G major, D minor, E-flat major, A major, C major
Mieczysław Weinberg
a violin sonatina, six sonatas with piano, and three solo sonatas
Johann Paul von Westhoff
 Sonata for violin and basso continuo (December 1682, published in Mercure galant)
 Sonate a Violino solo con basso continuo (Dresden, 1694)
Charles-Marie Widor
Violin Sonata No. 1, Op. 50 ("sonata for piano and violin", 1881)
Violin Sonata No. 2, Op. 79 (1907 rev. 1937)
Józef Wieniawski
Violin Sonata (1860)
Stefan Wolpe
Violin Sonata (1949)
Charles Wuorinen
Sonata for Violin and Piano (1988)

Y
Eugène Ysaÿe
Six Sonatas for solo violin, Op. 27

Z
Carlo Zuccari
 12 Sonate per violino é basso ò cembalo Op. 1 (Milano 1747)

See also 
 String instrument repertoire
 List of compositions for two violins

References

External links
 The Canon of Violin Literature

 
Violin